Lazar Stojsavljević (Serbian Cyrillic: Лазар Стојсављевић; born 5 May 1998) is a Serbian professional footballer who plays for AS Trenčín, as a central defender.

Career
Stojsavljević started his career at National League side Woking, first in the side's development team in 2013, followed by the Under 23s side. On 3 October 2017, he made his debut for the club, replacing Fabio Saraiva in the 71st minute during Woking's 2–0 away league victory over Chester. In January 2018, despite scoring the eventual winner and his first goal for the club, Stojsavljević suffered an extended period of absence after a fractured skull caused during a header in their 1–0 home victory against AFC Fylde.

He went onto make six appearances for the club, scoring once, before signing for Millwall after a trial period. On 16 May 2019, Millwall announced that Stojsavljević would be released at the end of his current deal.

On 14 June 2019, it was announced that he had signed for Newport County on a two year deal. Stojsavljević played for 29 minutes in his only appearance for Newport, in their 13 August EFL Cup first round win against Gillingham, and was substituted off shortly after Newport went 1-0 down. He subsequently left Newport County by mutual consent on 3 September 2019, and is now a free agent after only three months with the South Wales side. Newport manager Michael Flynn told the media in September 2019 that Stojsavljević had requested the contract termination and that the club had no financial burden from terminating the deal. Stojsavljević reportedly  returned to Serbia to pursue a footballing opportunity "in his home town". Flynn went on to say that in hindsight, he would not have signed Stojsavljevic, nor fellow defender Marvel Ekpiteta, as they were only stopgap signings while uncertainty continued around the re-signing of Mickey Demetriou, who later re-signed with Newport.

In January 2020, he signed for Vojvodina on a contract until January 2024. On 27 August 2020, in order to gain more first-team experience, Stojsavljević joined fellow Serbian SuperLiga side, Rad on a six-month loan deal and went onto make his debut during a 3–1 victory over Napredak Kruševac.

On 5 September 2021, Stojsavljević joined Slovak side, AS Trenčín and was immediately loaned out to second-tier side Dubnica, where he made his debut during a 1–0 home defeat to Dukla Banská Bystrica. Stojsavljević returned to AS Trenčín towards the end of October that year, eventually making his club debut during a Slovak Cup fourth round tie against TJD Príbelce, playing the full 90 minutes in the 3–0 victory.

Career statistics

References

External links 
 
 

1998 births
Living people
Serbian footballers
Woking F.C. players
Millwall F.C. players
Newport County A.F.C. players
FK Vojvodina players
FK Rad players
AS Trenčín players
FK Dubnica players
Association football defenders
Serbian expatriate footballers
Serbian expatriate sportspeople in England
Serbian expatriate sportspeople in Slovakia
Expatriate footballers in England
Expatriate footballers in Slovakia
Serbian expatriate sportspeople in Wales
Expatriate footballers in Wales
Footballers from Greater London
Slovak Super Liga players
National League (English football) players